Rhamnus pirifolia is a species of tree and shrub in the buckthorn family known by the common name island redberry. It is an island endemic which is known only from the Channel Islands of California and Guadalupe Island off Baja California. Its habitat consists of coastal sage scrub and chaparral.

Description
Rhamnus pirifolia is a spreading shrublike tree which approaches 10 meters-30 feet in maximum height. It has gray bark on its branches and the young twigs are purple in color. The thick evergreen leaves are oval in shape with pointed or nearly rounded tips, measuring 2 to 4 centimeters long. The edges are smooth or toothed and curve under, making the leaves concave. The inflorescence is a solitary flower or umbel of up to six flowers. The flower has four pointed sepals and no petals. The fruit is a drupe which ripens to bright red. It is just under a centimeter wide and contains two seeds.

See also
California chaparral and woodlands - (ecoregion)
California coastal sage and chaparral - (subecoregion)

References

External links
 Calflora Database: Rhamnus pirifolia (Island redberry)
Jepson Manual Jepson eFlora (TJM2) treatment of Rhamnus pirifolia
USDA Plants Profile for Rhamnus pirifolia
UC CalPhotos gallery of Rhamnus pirifolia images

pirifolia
Endemic flora of California
Flora of Baja California
Natural history of the Channel Islands of California
Natural history of the California chaparral and woodlands
Taxa named by Edward Lee Greene
Flora without expected TNC conservation status